Scarlat A. Cantacuzino (June 6, 1874 – August 8, 1949) was a Romanian poet, essayist and diplomat.

Early life and education
Born in Bucharest to the magistrate Adolf Cantacuzino and his wife Ecaterina (née Iarca), he was a scion of the Cantacuzino family, which had an old tradition of political and cultural activity beginning with citations from Roman Imperium, affirming in Byzantine Imperium, European countries and primarily in Romania, with almost continuous citations after 1094. After attending primary school in his native city, he went to high school in Paris, followed by the law faculty of the University of Paris.

Career
Successively an attaché, secretary and adviser at the Romanian embassies in Paris, Brussels, and The Hague, Cantacuzino was Romania's chargé d'affaires in Paris in 1918, at the close of World War I. He returned to Bucharest in 1922, working as a minister plenipotentiary at the Foreign Ministry, while continuing to correspond with other writers. 

On an August morning in 1949, during the early Communist regime, he was told he had several hours to vacate his beloved, book-filled house. Toward evening, a little suitcase in hand, the hat-wearing, cane-carrying elderly gentleman made his way to the modest basement room he had rented and lay down. He was found dead the following day.

Family
Cantacuzino married Julietta, the daughter of Basile M. Missir, in 1912. The following year, he dedicated the volume Amour de Juliette to her. Their daughter Armanda was born in Paris on September 1, 1913, and she married Constantin Roco in 1945. She is followed by two children, Mihaela and Mihail, and two grandchildren, Constance Armanda Roco and Charles Roco.

Poetry and essays
A French-language poet who wrote under the name Charles-Adolphe Cantacuzène, he published numerous volumes of poems, essays and studies of literary and art history. He was particularly interested in several important 18th century figures, such as Frederick the Great, the 7th Prince of Ligne and Antoine de Rivarol. His work appeared in Mercure de France, Journal des Débats, Le Figaro and Le Manuscrit Autographe. Attracted by the verses of Stéphane Mallarmé, who became his friend, he published his first volume, Les sourires glacés, at the age of 22 in 1896, upon the latter's recommendation. This and all his subsequent forty-five books were written in French. His poetry, Symbolist in style, was praised by Mallarmé, Paul Valéry and Remy de Gourmont. It shows erudition and delicacy at the same time, as well as a remarkable grasp of the French language's subtleties. The poetic and diplomatic contributions of Charles-Adolphe Cantacuzène have European dimensions.

Publications

Les sourires glacés, Librairie Académique Perrin, Paris, 1896
Les douleurs cadettes, Librairie Académique Perrin, Paris, 1897
Les chimères en danger, Librairie Académique Perrin, Paris 1898
Cinglons les souvenirs et cinglons les rêves!..., Librairie Académique Perrin, Paris, 1900
Sonnets en petit deuil, Librairie Académique Perrin, Paris, 1901
Litanies et petits états d'âme, Librairie Académique Perrin, Paris, 1902
Remember, Librairie Académique Perrin, Paris, 1903
Les Grâces inemployées, Librairie Académique Perrin, Paris, 1904
L'âme de Monsieur de Nion, C.L.G. Veldt, Amsterdam, 1905
Poussières et falbales, Librairie Académique Perrin, Paris, 1905
Synthèse attristée de Paris, Librairie Académique Perrin,Paris, 1906
Les Retrouvailles, Librairie Académique Perrin,Paris, 1908
Bétises pour Phébé, C.L.G. Veldt, Amsterdam, 1908 (essais)
Esprit de Charles-Adolphe Cantacuzène, Amsterdam, 1909
Larmes fouettées, Librairie Académique Perrin, Paris, 1911
Les adorables coincidences, Librairie Académique Perrin, Paris, 1912
Amour de Juliette, Librairie Académique Perrin, Paris, 1913
Apothéoses de météores, Librairie Académique Perrin, Paris, 1913
A une jolie, Poésie du Prince Ch.-Ad. Cantacuzene, Musique de Suzanne Mesureur. Heugel (Musique notée), 1913.
Mes Brouillards de roses, Librairie Académique Perrin, Paris, 1914
La Rose du centenaire, C.L.G. Veldt, La Haye, 1914
Lettre du Prince Charles-Adolphe Cantacuzène pour commémoration de centenaire de “Mes adieux a Beloeil” du Prince de Ligne. Association des Ecrivains Belges, Bruxelles-Paris-London, 1914
Hypotyposes, aléas et alinéas, Librairie Académique Perrin, Paris, 1916
Considerations lyriques: suivies d’inédite adnotations de Rivarol sur son examplaire de Hamboug – 1797.  Librairie Académique Perrin, Paris, 1917a
Mémoires fragmentes de Conseiller de Légation C. Extraits. Librairie Académique Perrin, Paris-Rotterdam, 1917b
Les Réalitès roses, Librairie Académique Perrin, Paris, 1918
Parenthèses paresseuses.  Librairie Académique Perrin, Paris, 1921
Charleadolphiana.  Librairie Académique Perrin, Paris and Ultrecht, 1921 (essais)
Extraits piquants et inconues de Fréderic II écrivain francais, avec un coup d’oeil de Charles-Adolphe Cantacuzène, Librairie Académique Perrin – Leyde, 1923
Précipité de suavité, Librairie Académique Perrin, Paris, Paris, 1925, Imprimeur de l’Académie Royale-Bruxelles-Marcel Hayez
Poésies dites et inédites du Prince de Ligne, publiés par Eenest Ganay et Charles-Adolphe Cantacuzène.  Edition des Annales du Prince de Ligne, Bruxelles, et Librairie Jean Naert, Paris, 1925
Phosphores mordorés, Librairie Académique Perrin, Paris, Paris, 1926
Quatorze quarts d’heure avec Monsieur Cantacuzène. Par M.G.C., sécrétaire de legation, Paris, 1926.
Glyptiques elliptiques, Librairie Académique Perrin, Paris, Paris, 1927
Identités versicolores, Librairie Académique Perrin, Paris, Paris, 1927
Les Automnes complémentaires, Librairie Académique Perrin, Paris, 1928
L'au-delà de l'en deçà, Librairie Académique Perrin, Paris, Paris, 1931
Essai anthologique, Eclats de conversations,  Albert Messein, Collection la Phalange, Paris, Paris, 1932
Sonnets sans écho, Librairie Académique Perrin, Paris, Paris, 1932
Prince de Ligne, Mercure de France, Collection des plus belles pages, Paris, 1934
Frédéric II, Mercure de France, Collection des plus belles pages, Paris, 1935
Fragments, Albert Messein Editeur, Paris, 1935
Les plus belles pages de Sénac de Meilhan.  Mercure de France, Paris, 1935
Les dernierés aurores, Librairie Académique Perrin, Paris, 1938
Nouveaux fragments, Albert Messein Editeur, Paris, 1940 and 1943

Awards
He was awarded the Order of the Star of Romania, the Legion of Honour from France, and the Order of Leopold from Belgium.

Notes

1874 births
1949 deaths
20th-century Romanian poets
Romanian male poets
Symbolist poets
20th-century Romanian historians
Romanian literary historians
Romanian art historians
20th-century essayists
Romanian essayists
Male essayists
Romanian writers in French
Diplomats from Bucharest
Writers from Bucharest
Scarlat
University of Paris alumni
20th-century Romanian male writers
Knights of the Order of the Star of Romania
Officiers of the Légion d'honneur
Romanian expatriates in France